Salesbox CRM is a Sales CRM tool from Stockholm, Sweden. It is designed as an integrated end-to-end application (OMNI-channel) for sales administration.

History 

Salesbox CRM was founded in 2014 and the system can be accessed worldwide, and is available in 16 languages, including English, Spanish, Portuguese, German and French.

Salesbox has won the "Best Sales CRM Product or Service Award" at the Sales Innovation Expo in 2016.

See also 

Sales management
Customer relationship management
Comparison of CRM systems
Comparison of Mobile CRM systems

References

External links 
 

Customer relationship management software companies